Li Xiaohong (Chinese:李小红；born 8 January 1995) is a Chinese female triple jumper.

She competed in the Women's triple jump event at the 2015 World Championships in Athletics in Beijing, China.  The following year she competed in the 2016 Olympics.

Her personal bests in the event are 14.20 metres outdoors (+1.6 m/s, Chanthaburi 2015) and 14.06 metres indoors (Nanjing 2013).  She set her personal best in the long jump of 6.27m while winning the 2014 Asian Junior Athletics Championships.

Competition record

References

External links

http://www.gettyimages.com/pictures/li-xiaohong--friidrottare-16021699#chinas-li-xiaohong-competes-in-the-womens-triple-jump-qualifying-picture-id589070630
http://www.zimbio.com/photos/Xiaohong+Li

Chinese female triple jumpers
Living people
Place of birth missing (living people)
1995 births
World Athletics Championships athletes for China
Athletes (track and field) at the 2016 Summer Olympics
Olympic athletes of China